Jiexiu is a county-level city in the central part of Shanxi Province, China. It is under the administration of the prefecture-level city of Jinzhong and is located in the latter's western confines. Notable sites in and around Jiexiu include Mount Mian, Zhangbi Fortress, Houtu Temple and Xianshenlou.

Names
By the Jin, the territory was known as Dingyang and the settlement at Jiexiu proper as Pingchang. Under the Northern Wei (4th–5th century), both became known as JiexiuCommandery. Under the Tang, this was renamed Jiezhou AD618–627.

History

Mianshang was supposedly set apart by Duke Chong'er to endow sacrifices for his retainer Jie Zhitui BC. The early histories state that Jie had loyally followed Chong'er in exile around China for 19 years but, when Chong'er was installed as duke of Jin by a Qin army, Jie had chosen to retire as a hermit rather than debase himself by asking for favors. In time, this caused him to be seen as a Taoist immortal. Later legend embellished the tale, having Jie save Chong'er from starvation by cooking a soup made from meat from his own thigh only to be killed when Chong'er listened to advice from Jin courtiers that the way to drive him out of the mountains was to light a forest fire. The idea was that Jie's duty to his mother would overcome his pride and they would flee together; instead, their corpses were found days later beneath a willow. Temples were erected in Jie's honor and, by the Han, the people of Shanxi tried to curry favor with his spirit by observing a Cold Food Festival in the dead of winter. They ignored repeated attempts to ban it although, as it moved to spring and spread throughout China, it eventually developed into the present-day Tomb-Sweeping Festival.

During the Warring States Period, the area of Jiexiu was held by Zhao before its conquest by Qin. Under the Han, it was part of Dingyang County (t, s, Dìngyáng Xiàn) in Shang Commandery. Jiexiu County was created under the Jin, but with its seat southeast of the current town. The Northern Wei moved to the present location—then known as Pingchang—around AD484 and made it the seat of a commandery. This was made a county again by the Sui in 598, restored by the Tang in 617, and changed to a prefecture the next year.

Climate
Jiexiu experiences a semi-arid climate (Köppen climate classification BSk). Spring is dry, with frequent dust storms, followed by early summer heat waves. Summer tends to be warm to hot with most of the year's rainfall concentrated in July and August. Winter is long and cold, but dry and sunny. Because of the aridity, there tends to be considerable diurnal variation in temperature, except during the summer. With monthly percent possible sunshine ranging from 49% in July to 60% in May, the city receives 2,425 hours of bright sunshine annually.

Government
Jiexiu administers an area divided into five subdistricts, seven towns, and three townships:

Transport
G5 Beijing–Kunming Expressway
China National Highway 108

Notes

References

Citations

Bibliography

 .
 
 .
 .
 .
 .
 .
 .
 .
 . 
 .
 .
 .
 .

External links
www.xzqh.org 

County-level divisions of Shanxi
Jinzhong